The Herreshoff 12½ Footer is a one-design keelboat.

History 

Nathanael Greene Herreshoff designed the 12½ footer in 1914. It has been in continuous production since then, and is nearly universally acclaimed as one of the finest small boats of all time  He was 66 years old by then, and had all the experience from a full and legendary career of designing and building yachts. He had already accumulated 5 of the never-matched record of 6 consecutive America’s Cup defenses, and 6 consecutive victories.

The Herreshoff Manufacturing Company took the first orders for the 12½ footer in 1914 and built 364 wooden hulls through 1943. Following the closing of HMC production, the Quincy Adams Yacht Yard was licensed by HMC to build the design. Quincy Adams used the Herreshoff builder’s plate, and built 51 hulls from 1943 through 1948. The Quincy Adams boats had hull numbers in the 2000s, and were planked with mahogany rather than the white cedar used by HMC. They also have something of a reverse sheer forward.

In 1947, Cape Cod Shipbuilding acquired the rights to the design. They built about 35 wooden hulls between 1948 and 1950, when they switched to fiberglass.

Another company, Doughdish, Inc. is building a fiberglass version of the 12½. Since Cape Cod’s rights prohibit anyone else from using the trademarked named “Herreshoff 12½”, the boat is called Doughdish. The molds were created by taking the lines from three original wooden hulls. Bill Harding, the creator of the Doughdish, took great pains to ensure his boat was an exact replica of the original, even eschewing the weight reductions afforded by fiberglass construction to ensure the Doughdish is authentic in every way (other than building material). In fact, the Doughdish is allowed to compete against the original wooden boats in association regattas, while the Cape Cod Shipbuilding 12½ is not. Finally, since 2006 the Herreshoff 12½ is once again available in wood from Artisan Boatworks of Rockport, ME.

The design was developed into the Bull's Eye, also first built in 1914 and the Buzzards Bay 14, designed in 1940.

Current builders of Herreshoff 12½ Footers

References

External links 
The H Class Association

Herreshoff Museums and Archives 
The Herreshoff Marine Museum / America's Cup Hall of Fame
The Herreshoff Legacy: An MIT Museum Project
The Herreshoff Registry

Keelboats
1910s sailboat type designs
Sailboat type designs by Nathanael Greene Herreshoff
Sailboat types built by Cape Cod Shipbuilding